"New York Raining" is a song from American rapper Charles Hamilton, featuring British singer Rita Ora. The song was released on March 18, 2015. The track appears on the deluxe edition of the season one soundtrack for Fox's TV series ''Empire.

Track listing
Digital download
"New York Raining" – 3:34

Digital download – Remixes
"New York Raining" (Culture Shock Remix) – 4:19
"New York Raining" (Lucky Charmes Remix) – 4:11

Charts

Release history

References

2015 singles
Rita Ora songs
2015 songs
Republic Records singles
Songs written by Jason Pebworth
Songs written by George Astasio
Songs written by Jon Shave
Song recordings produced by the Invisible Men
Songs written by Laura White